Unyk.com is a contact management website that allows users to put together an intelligent address book.

Concept 

Users complete their personal and professional contact information in their profile on the website. They can then aggregate the contacts from all their messaging services in their address book, and invite these contacts to complete their own profile on the website. When information is edited by a user, that information automatically appears in his contacts’ address books, and vice versa. Contrary to other sites, the user's contacts are not visible to other users.

A UNYK mobile platform, as well as a function to export contacts to major social networking platforms, are planned upgrades.

Company information 

The company has been in business since 2005 and has recently announced that it has reached 31 million users and more than a billion managed contacts on the site. 
Unyk.com was an independent company that was financed by private capital, until October 2009, when it was bought by the social network Viadeo. They announced in early 2012 that UNYK had been fully integrated into Viadeo. The unyk.com website lands at a parking page as of December 2018.

References

External links
  Unyk.com Web site

Online person databases